The Marshallese records in swimming are the fastest ever performances of swimmers from Marshall Islands, which are recognised and ratified by the Marshall Islands Swimming Federation.

All records were set in finals unless noted otherwise.

Long Course (50 m)

Men

Women

Short Course (25 m)

Men

Women

References

External links
 Marshall Islands National Olympic Committee web site

Marshall Islands
Records
Swimming
Swimming